Günter Beier (born 2 March 1942) is a German former gymnast. He competed at the 1968 Summer Olympics in all artistic gymnastics events and won a bronze medal with the East German team. Individually his best achievement was 15th place in the vault. He won four consecutive national titles in the vault in 1964–1967.

References

1942 births
People from Altenburg
Living people
German male artistic gymnasts
Olympic gymnasts of East Germany
Gymnasts at the 1968 Summer Olympics
Olympic bronze medalists for East Germany
Olympic medalists in gymnastics
Sportspeople from Thuringia
Medalists at the 1968 Summer Olympics